Queen Anne Revival architecture may mean

 British Queen Anne Revival architecture, found in Britain from the 1870s, with a mix of English, Flemish and other house styles, influenced by the Arts and Crafts movement 
Queen Anne architecture in the United States, where what is termed "Queen Anne" is technically a revival style
 New World Queen Anne Revival architecture, found elsewhere in North America, and in South America and Australia from the 1890s, with "free Renaissance" styles in contrast to Gothic Revival architecture